Buckleya distichophylla, commonly called piratebush, is a flowering plant in the family Santalaceae, native to the Southern United States. It is a rare plant, found only in sporadic mountainous areas of North Carolina, Tennessee, and Virginia.

What makes the piratebush unique is in how it survives. The plant does not survive on photosynthesis only as its pale green leaves indicate less chlorophyll than other plants. In addition to photosynthesis, piratebush receives nutrients through parasitizing other species. The plant is hemiparasitic, attaching itself to the root systems of other plants with structures called haustoria and draw nutrients through them. Although originally thought to attach itself only to hemlock trees, it has since been determined that piratebush can attach to many different species.

At present, piratebush has only been identified in  mountainous areas of North Carolina, Tennessee, and Virginia. The number of piratebush plants on Poor Mountain is greater than all of the others existing at other locations. Although many other locations in the Appalachians feature habitats that seemingly would support piratebush, scientists have yet to determine why the plant exists in so few places.

The plant was initially discovered and described as a member of the genus Borya in the olive family by Thomas Nuttall in 1818 along the French Broad River in the vicinity of Paint Rock in Western North Carolina. The plant was rediscovered in 1843 by Samuel Buckley with John Torrey classifying the plant as Buckleya distichophylla.

References

External links
Carolina Nature
Southeastern Flora

Santalaceae
Flora of the Southwestern United States
Plants described in 1818
Taxa named by John Torrey
Taxa named by Thomas Nuttall